Neve McIntosh (born Carol McIntosh; 9 April 1972) is a Scottish actress.

Early life
Born in Paisley, Renfrewshire, McIntosh grew up in Edinburgh, where she attended Boroughmuir High School. She was a member of Edinburgh Youth Theatre in the late 1980s, appearing in Mother Goose and Doctor in the House. She moved to Glasgow to attend the Royal Scottish Academy of Music and Drama, after which she was in repertory companies at Perth and at The Little Theatre on the Isle of Mull.

During the Second World War McIntosh's grandfather was captured at Dunkirk and died of pneumonia in a German prisoner-of-war camp in Poland.

Acting career

Theatre
She next played in a Glasgow stage production of The Trick is to Keep Breathing. She then played in the RSC production of Dickens' Great Expectations in Stratford and starred as Portia in Shakespeare's The Merchant of Venice at the Lyceum in Edinburgh. 

In summer 2009 she performed in the Sylvia Plath play Three Women at the Edinburgh Festival. In February 2010, McIntosh appeared as the lead character "Catherine" in the play Proof at Perth Theatre. In September 2011, she played Goneril in a production of King Lear at the West Yorkshire Playhouse in Leeds. McIntosh appeared in the Actors Touring Company production of David Greig's The Events in mid-2013, also appearing in a production in New York in early 2015. 

She appeared in the play Meet Me at Dawn in the 2017 Edinburgh International Festival, for which she received praise.

Film
She also appeared in American director Mark L. Feinsod's first film, Love And Lung Cancer. Alongside her television work she has appeared in the films Gypsy Woman and One Last Chance. In 2008 and 2009 McIntosh starred in several films, including Salvage, Spring 1941 (with co-star Joseph Fiennes) and the award-winning The Be All and End All.

Television
McIntosh played Beryl Stapleton in the 2002 BBC version of The Hound of the Baskervilles, and Fuchsia in the 2000 BBC and WGBH Boston production of Gormenghast, a miniseries based on the first two books of the trilogy by Mervyn Peake. She also played the title role in Lady Audley's Secret.

She appeared in the first British Sky Broadcasting-produced "Doc Martin" prequel (in which the Martin Clunes character was named Bamford, rather than his later name Ellingham), as a lonely villager with an asthmatic son, to whom Martin is attracted.

In 2004, McIntosh starred in Bodies, a medical drama produced by BBC Three and based on the book Bodies by Jed Mercurio. She has also appeared in several other television dramas, including Psychos, Ghost Squad, Marple, Murder City, Bodies-2 and Low Winter Sun. She also recorded an episode of Law & Order: UK.

In December 2009 McIntosh appeared in an episode of Sky 1's 10 Minute Tales playing the wife of Peter Capaldi's character.

In May 2010, McIntosh appeared in two episodes of the 2010 series of Doctor Who beside the Doctor played by Matt Smith. She plays Alaya and Restac, two Silurian sisters who have been disturbed under the earth, one captured by humans and the other demanding vengeance. In October 2010, she starred alongside former Doctor Who star, David Tennant, in Single Father, a BBC drama. She portrayed the part of Anna, the sister of the dead wife of Tennant's character (Dave).

McIntosh returned as a new Silurian character, Madame Vastra, in the Doctor Who Series 6 mid-series episode "A Good Man Goes to War", which aired in the UK on 4 June 2011. The character is a sword-wielding, human-eating late Victorian crime fighter, and an old friend of The Doctor.

Neve McIntosh appeared in Ripper Street for one episode in the November 2013 episode 3 "Become Man" where she played the character Raine. She also appeared as Janina for 2 episodes of Dracula – a British-American horror drama TV series that premièred on NBC on 25 October 2013. The series aired in the United Kingdom from 31 October 2013, to 16 January 2014, on Sky Living.

McIntosh appeared in the BBC One series Case Histories as Joanna Hunter which aired in June 2011. She also starred in Season 2 of the BBC Three drama, Lip Service, as a love interest of one of the main characters, Sadie.

McIntosh returned to Doctor Who in the 2012 Christmas special, and in the episodes "The Crimson Horror" and "The Name of the Doctor". In each of these episodes, she reprises her role as Madame Vastra, who along with her wife, Jenny Flint, and Strax, a former Sontaran nurse, form an investigating team. While there is a suggestive chemistry between Vastra and her chambermaid Jenny, in "A Good Man Goes to War", the later episodes explicitly mention that Vastra and Jenny are married.

In 2017, McIntosh played Kay Gillies in the BBC One drama The Replacement. She plays Kate Kilmuir in the BBC drama Shetland.

Doctor Who appearances
"The Hungry Earth" / "Cold Blood" (2010) – Alaya / Restac
"A Good Man Goes to War" (2011) – Madame Vastra
"The Great Detective" (2012, minisode) – Madame Vastra
"Vastra Investigates" (2012, minisode) – Madame Vastra
"The Snowmen" (2012) – Madame Vastra
"The Battle of Demon's Run: Two Days Later" (2013) – Madame Vastra
"The Crimson Horror" (2013) – Madame Vastra
"The Name of the Doctor" (2013) – Madame Vastra
"Doctor Who Prom" (2013) – Madame Vastra
"Deep Breath" (2014) – Madame Vastra

Personal life
McIntosh was married to Alex Sahla, a cameraman, whom she met while filming the 1999 TV series Psychos. They separated in 2006, and their divorce was finalised in 2009.

Filmography

Radio

Stage

References

External links
 

1972 births
Living people
Actresses from Paisley, Renfrewshire
Alumni of the Royal Conservatoire of Scotland
People educated at Boroughmuir High School
Actresses from Edinburgh
Scottish television actresses
Scottish stage actresses
Scottish film actresses
21st-century Scottish actresses